Three Blind Mice is a 2003 British / French crime film directed by Mathias Ledoux and starring Edward Furlong and Emilia Fox.

Cast 
 Edward Furlong - Thomas Cross
 Emilia Fox - Claire Bligh
 Chiwetel Ejiofor - Mark Hayward
 Sara Stewart - Thomas's Boss
 Gary Connery - The Pizza Delivery Man
 Elsa Zylberstein - Nathalie
 Valérie Decobert-Koretzky - Cathy 
 Ben Miles - Lindsey
 Philip Whitchurch - Carlin
 Peter Wight - Tomlinson
 Craig Kelly - Frank

References

External links 

2000s crime films
British crime thriller films
French crime thriller films
2000s English-language films
2000s British films
2000s French films